Maria Yakovlevna Barmich (born 1934) is a professor, researcher of the Nenets language, and the first scientist among Nenets women.

She was born in the Kaninskaya tundra of the Kanino-Timan region of the Nenets Autonomous Okrug, Arkhangelsk Oblast. She lives in Saint Petersburg, and she works at the Institute of the Peoples of the North. For many years she has been teaching the Nenets language. She is the author of textbooks on the Nenets language, culture, and life.

On December 9, 2016, in Naryan-Mar, she was a judge for the competition "Vadava Letrakhava," which means "Let's save our native language."

References

1934 births
Nenets people
Nenets-language writers
Living people
20th-century women
21st-century women
People from Nenets Autonomous Okrug
Herzen University alumni